Krishan is a given name and surname. Notable persons with that name include:

People with the given name
Krishan Bheel (born 1968), Pakistani politician
Krishan Chander (1914–1977), Urdu and Hindi Afsaana Nigaar, or short story writer
Krishan Dev Sethi, the current general secretary of Democratic Conference Jammu and Kashmir
Krishan Dinidu (born 1990), Sri Lankan cricketer
Krishan Imdika (born 1976), Sri Lankan cricketer
Krishan Kant, the tenth vice president of India from 1997 until his death
Krishan Kant Saini (born 1931), Indian Airforce helicopter pilot who achieved the world's highest altitude helicopter landing
Krishan Kumar (sociologist) (born 1942), British sociologist
Krishan Kumar (actor), Indian film actor and producer
Krishan Kumar Modi, (born 1940), Indian businessman and head of Modi Enterprises
Krishan Kumar Sharma "Rasik" (born 1983), Hindi, Punjabi, English and Urdu poet and writer
Krishan Lal Balmiki (1942–2010), Indian politician of the Bharatiya Janata Party, member of the Parliament of India representing Rajasthan
Krishan Sabnani (born 1954), senior vice president of the Networking Research Laboratory at Alcatel-Lucent Bell Labs in New Jersey
Maharaj Krishan Kaushik (1955–2021), former member of the India men's national field hockey team and former coach
Predhiman Krishan Kaw, Indian plasma physicist, currently the director of the Institute for Plasma Research
Raj Krishan Gaur (born 1931), Agricultural minister from Himachal
Vikas Krishan Yadav (born 1992), Indian male boxer from Bhiwani district in Haryana, won a gold medal in the 2010 Asian Games

People with the surname
Gopal Krishan, Indian musician and player of the vichitra veena
Guru Har Krishan (1656–1664), the eighth of the Eleven Gurus of Sikhism
Kewal Krishan (1923–2008), Indian medical practitioner and politician
Rajendra Krishan (1919–1988), Indian poet, lyricist and screenwriter

See also
Krischan
Krishan Avtaar, 1993 Hindi-language Indian feature film
Krishan Nagar, part of the Islampura neighbourhood of Lahore, Punjab, Pakistan
Shaheed Krishan Chand Memorial Stadium (previously known as the Paddal Ground), a cricket ground in Mandi, Himachal Pradesh, India
Shri Krishan Institute Of Engineering & Technology, private engineering institute in Kurukshetra, Haryana, India